Brian Cripsey (born 26 June 1931) is an English former professional footballer who played as a left winger.

Career
Born in Hull, Cripsey played for Brunswick Institute, Hull City, Wrexham and Bridlington Town.

References

1931 births
Living people
English footballers
Hull City A.F.C. players
Wrexham A.F.C. players
Bridlington Town A.F.C. players
English Football League players
Association football wingers